The Chester B. Woodward House is a historic house in Topeka, Kansas. It was built in 1923 for Chester B. Woodward, a businessman. Woodward served as the vice president of the Central National Bank and Trust Company of Topeka from 1920 to 1928 and the president of the Topeka Morris Plan Company from 1928 to 1940.

The house was designed by Root & Siemens in the Classical Revival architectural style. It has been listed on the National Register of Historic Places since June 25, 1992.

References

Houses on the National Register of Historic Places in Kansas
National Register of Historic Places in Shawnee County, Kansas
Neoclassical architecture in Kansas
Houses completed in 1923